Steven J. "Steve" Sodders was a Democratic politician, who was a  Mayor of State Center, Iowa. He represented the 22nd and 36th Districts in the Iowa Senate between 2009 and 2017. He also served as Deputy Sheriff in Marshall County until he was forced into early retirement for falsifying records. He received his A.S. from Iowa Valley Community College and is attending Iowa State University, pursuing a degree in Sociology. He received an honorary degree in Educational Leadership from Iowa Valley Community College.

Sodders served on several committees in the Iowa Senate - Chair Economic Growth committee; the Education committee; Vice-Chair Government Oversight committee;  the Judiciary Committee; the State Government Committee; and the Veterans Affairs committee.

Sodders was elected in 2008 with 14,837 votes, defeating Republican opponent Jarret P. Heil.

Sodders retired as a deputy sheriff dated 20 November 2018".

References

External links
Senator Steve Sodders official Iowa Legislature site
Senator Steve Sodders official Iowa General Assembly site
State Senator Steve Sodders official constituency site
 

|-

|-

Democratic Party Iowa state senators
Living people
Iowa State University alumni
American deputy sheriffs
People from Marshall County, Iowa
Place of birth missing (living people)
1968 births
21st-century American politicians